Poo is a 2008 Indian Tamil-language romantic drama film directed by Sasi, based on the short story, Veyilodu Poi written by Thamizh Selvan. The film, produced by Moser Baer and Nesagee Cinemas, stars Srikanth and Parvathy. It was released on 28 November 2008.

Plot
The film is set in a village named Kongankulam, located between Rajapalayam and Sivakasi in southern Tamil Nadu. It entails two different dreams of two different people for one person. The main aspects of this film are of the selfless, deep love and admiration that Maari develops for her cousin Thangarasu and the love and expectations of a poor, hardworking father to his son Thangarasu.

The film begins showing Maari happily married to her husband Karuppasamy, a small shop owner. She leads an uncomplaining life with a smile on her face at all shades of events, which fascinates even Karuppasamy. One day, she leaves alone to her village festival with the permission of Karuppasamy, who promises that he will follow her there after his business for the day has finished. When her mother asks why Maari came alone, she answers that she came early in order to see Thangarasu, much to her mother's dismay. On her way to see Thangarasu, she begins to reminisce of her past that includes her bold proclamation of her aim to be Thangarasu's wife from her school days – a time when they used to play together – that develops into her shy, unrequited yearning for him in her teenage years – a time when Thangarasu is an engineering student, while Maari works as a labourer in her village's fireworks company along with her best friend Cheeni, a practical girl who at first advises Maari to be realistic, but later, seeing her passion for Thangarasu, helps her out in many ways as she could. By that time, everyone in her village knows about her ardent love for Thangarasu except for him. After many attempts, she fails at trying to confess her love to him or to even talk to him openly without feeling shy while he is away in city or in her village. However, Thanagarasu comes to realise her love after many incidents where people he knows tells him of this.

At the same time, the film shows Thangarasu's father working as a cart driver and carrying labourer. He expects respect for his age from his young bosses and colleagues, but due to an unpleasant incident, he presumably thinks that being rich and owning modern items such as a car only will bring him respect. He takes pride in the fact that his son is studying to be an engineer and dreams of big things about him. However, Thangarasu breaks his castle in the sky by saying that once he starts working, unless he joins a renowned company, his salary will be merely Rs. 6000, not as large as Rs.35000 as software engineers earn, as he is just a mechanical engineer. This shatters the dreams of Thangarasu's father, who then resorts to alcohol and deems that he will never achieve the respect that he yearns.

Thangarasu's father is against the idea of Thangarasu marrying Maari as he believes that one cannot live happily and with respect just alone with higher education, but with money. Thangarasu, though initially after coming to know of Maari's faithful passion, begins to reciprocate her feelings, though after finding out that the son of his best friend who had married his cousin had birth defections, he finds it not a good idea to marry someone in related by blood. Therefore, heartbreakingly agreeing to marry the proposed daughter of someone from a wealthy family that his father approves of, thus choosing his father's dream. Maari too agrees to marry someone else on a condition that her mother and brother must attend Thangarasu's wedding as they initially refused to go after discovering that Thangarasu will not wed Maari. Maari happily marries while wishing that Thangarasu and his wife to become successful and Thangarasu to be happy just as she will try to be with Karuppasamy.

The current day sees Maari entering Thangarasu's house and seeing a car parked outside and Thangarasu talking to someone on a phone about business-related matters. Seeing her come, he directs her to go inside. She comes into the house and sees it decorated with latest modern devices. Nothing made her happier than seeing Thangarasu's wedding photo hung on the wall. She sees Thangarasu's wife in the backyard sitting on a chair and reading a novel. She goes up to her and talks. Initially nice, his wife sneers later at the question of possible pregnancy, making Maari shocked. She later witnesses in a hidden place that Thangarasu's wife treats him badly and shames him for marrying her shamelessly, a rich woman, when he himself is poor. Though begging his wife to stop shouting in fear that Maari may hear and knowing that she still lives for him and hearing this will terribly traumatize her, he sees that she is hiding listening to all of this with tears in her eyes. He then goes away with a shattered heart to his room, while Maari runs away and meets Thangarasu's father outside, who heeds to the situation seeing his arrogant daughter-in-law outside and his crying son inside, is also heartbroken. He explains to Maari saying, "We both had a dream that we wanted, but I did not stop to hear the dream of that girl, by this indirectly quoting that if it wasn't for him, Thangarasu, would not be in this unhappy marriage right now."

Maari flees from the scene and departs with her belongings back on the way she came, just as Karuppasamy touches his feet into the village. He discovers Maari too shocked to understand what had happened, sitting on a tree stump emotionless. Upon hearing no answers from Maari for why she is here and not at her home, he shakes her, and she starts wailing out loud, showing that her seemingly happy life led with Karuppasamy was all in hope that Thangarasu was also leading a happy life. Since he is not, it seems that she will lament for the rest of her life, knowing the sadness and pain of her lover, whom she cannot console.

Cast
Srikanth as Thangarasu
Parvathy as Maari
Maila as young Maari
Inigo Prabhakaran as Karuppasamy (Maari's husband)
Ram as Thangaraasu's father
Inbanila as Cheeni
Ashwanth Thilak as Thangarasu's friend
Periya Karuppu Thevar
Paravai Muniyamma
Kandasamy as Tea shop owner

Production
In January 2007, Sasi announced that he would collaborate again with Srikanth in a project titled Imm and the pair spent a year working on the pre-production work of the film. Sasi shelved the venture and chose to make his next film, Poo (Flower), after being inspired by the romantic short story of Veyilodu Poi written by Thamizh Selvan, noting that the effect that the story had on him was "mind-blowing" and decided that he had "to take the story to everyone". He chose to utilise a new technical team for the project, choosing to sign up S. S. Kumaran and P. G. Muthiah for the music and cinematography respectively, with the pair both passing a selection interview set up by Sasi. Srikanth was retained and the director worked on toning down the actor's complexion, while Malayalam actress Parvathy Thiruvothu was selected to play the lead role in the film, and also went through a similar character acclimatisatio procedure.

Release
Upon release in December 2008, the film gained positive reviews with a critic noting "the one man who deserves an ovation here is director Sasi", "handling the story, screenplay, dialogue and direction, he has given a product that will please all true lovers of cinema and he must also be credited with extracting moving performances from the cast." A reviewer from Rediff.com wrote "as far as screenplays and performances go, Sasi has a winner on his hands. Few rural sagas are this refreshing or poetic." The film subsequently won accolades at several regional award ceremonies such as the 56th Filmfare Awards South, Vijay Awards and the Tamil Nadu State Film Awards, where it won recognition including a special mention in the Best Film category as another for portraying women in good light. The film was also screened across international film festivals, notably at the Los Angeles Indian Film Festival, and won Sasi the Best Director award in Ahmedabad Film Festival.

Soundtrack
The soundtrack features 6 tracks, composed by debutant S. S. Kumaran. The soundtrack was released on 25 September 2008 in a launch event with the special guest being film director Ameer.

Awards and nominations
2008 Ahmedabad Film Festival
 Won – Best Film
 Won – Best Director – Sasi

2008 Tamil Nadu State Film Awards
 Won – Best Film Portraying Woman in Good Light
 Won – Best Storywriter – Tamizhchelvan

2008 Vijay Awards
 Won – Vijay Award for Best Debut Actress – Parvathy Thiruvothu
 Nominated – Best Director – Sasi
 Nominated – Best Editor – Madan Gunadeva
 Nominated – Vijay Award for Best Actress – Parvathy Thiruvothu 
 Nominated – Best Make Up – Shanmugham & Manohar

2008 56th Filmfare Awards South
 Won – Filmfare Award for Best Actress - Tamil- Parvathy Thiruvothu

2008 Ananda Vikatan Awards

 Won – Best Film
 Won – Best Actress – Parvathy Thiruvothu 
 Won – Best Supporting Actor – Ramu
 Won – Best Storywriter – S. Tamizhchelvan

 Makkal TV Awards Makkal
 Won – Best Film

Jaya TV Awards
 Won – Best Film
 Won – Best Music Director

 Popular Film Awards
 Won – Best Film
 Won – Best Director – Sasi

Screened at Festivals
 Chennai International Film Festival
 Ahmedabad Film Festival
 Norway Film Festival
 Los Angeles Indian Film Festival
 Official Selection at the Indian Panorama

References

2008 films
2000s Tamil-language films
Indian romantic drama films
Films based on short fiction
Films set in Tamil Nadu
Films shot in Tamil Nadu
Films directed by Sasi (director)
2008 romantic drama films